The Tucson Icemen were a minor professional ice hockey team in the Southwest Hockey League from 1976 to 1977.

References

Sports in Tucson, Arizona
Ice hockey clubs established in 1976
Ice hockey clubs disestablished in 1977